The SkyKnight is an all-weather multi-target short-range air defence missile. It was developed by Halcon Systems and is the United Arab Emirates' first designed counter-rocket, artillery, and mortar (C-RAM) missile. SkyKnight is planned to be integrated into Rheinmetall Skynex air defence system. Skynex is a fully networked system of sensors and effectors linked via a tactical communications network to provide a mostly automated layered defence against various aerial threats. Up to four -long SkyKnight missile launcher units (MLU) with 60 rounds each can be controlled in a Skynex battery. An MLU can launch up to five missiles in one second and each can simultaneously fire 20 at one time to neutralize 80 incoming targets. The Skynex system combines the SkyKnight with up to four Oerlikon Revolver Gun Mk3 35 mm revolver cannons to handle anything that penetrates through the missile defenses.

See also
Iron Dome
Skyshield

References

External links
SKYNEX SKYKNIGHT. Halcon

21st-century surface-to-air missiles
Weapons of the United Arab Emirates
Rheinmetall